Las Piedras District is one of four districts of the province Tambopata in Peru. Bordered by the Rio Mavila on the northern boundary and the Rio Las Piedras to the south, the district comprises typical uninhabited lowland neotropical rainforest: Largely moist broadleaf evergreen or semi-evergreen with overstorey canopy and emergent crowns, medium layer canopy, lower canopy, shrub level and understory. The forest-structure is influenced by the flood regimes of the Las Piedras River, a highly meandering, white-water affluent of the Madre de Dios River.

References